Cannabinoids are several structural classes of compounds found in the cannabis plant primarily and most animal organisms (although insects lack such receptors) or as synthetic compounds. The most notable cannabinoid is the phytocannabinoid tetrahydrocannabinol (THC) (delta-9-THC), the primary psychoactive compound in cannabis. Cannabidiol (CBD) is also a major constituent of temperate cannabis plants and a minor constituent in tropical varieties. At least 113 distinct phytocannabinoids have been isolated from cannabis, although only four (i.e., THCA, CBDA, CBCA and their common precursor CBGA) have been demonstrated to have a biogenetic origin. It was reported in 2020 that phytocannabinoids can be found in other plants such as rhododendron, licorice and liverwort, and earlier in Echinacea.

Phytocannabinoids are multi-ring phenolic compounds structurally related to THC, but endocannabinoids are fatty acid derivatives. Nonclassical synthetic cannabinoids (cannabimimetics) include aminoalkylindoles, 1,5-diarylpyrazoles, quinolines, and arylsulfonamides as well as eicosanoids related to endocannabinoids.

Uses 
Medical uses include the treatment of nausea due to chemotherapy, spasticity, and possibly neuropathic pain. Common side effects include dizziness, sedation, confusion, dissociation, and "feeling high".

Cannabinoid receptors 
Before the 1980s, cannabinoids were speculated to produce their physiological and behavioral effects via nonspecific interaction with cell membranes, instead of interacting with specific membrane-bound receptors. The discovery of the first cannabinoid receptors in the 1980s helped to resolve this debate. These receptors are common in animals. Two known cannabinoid receptors are termed CB1 and CB2, with mounting evidence of more. The human brain has more cannabinoid receptors than any other G protein-coupled receptor (GPCR) type.

The Endocannabinoid System (ECS) regulates many functions of the human body. The ECS plays an important role in multiple aspects of neural functions, including the control of movement and motor coordination, learning and memory, emotion and motivation, addictive-like behavior and pain modulation, among others.

Cannabinoid receptor type 1 

CB1 receptors are found primarily in the brain, more specifically in the basal ganglia and in the limbic system, including the hippocampus and the striatum. They are also found in the cerebellum and in both male and female reproductive systems. CB1 receptors are absent in the medulla oblongata, the part of the brain stem responsible for respiratory and cardiovascular functions. CB1 is also found in the human anterior eye and retina.

Cannabinoid receptor type 2 

CB2 receptors are predominantly found in the immune system, or immune-derived cells with varying expression patterns. While found only in the peripheral nervous system, a report does indicate that CB2 is expressed by a subpopulation of microglia in the human cerebellum. CB2 receptors appear to be responsible for immunomodulatory and possibly other therapeutic effects of cannabinoid as seen in vitro and in animal models.

Phytocannabinoids 

The classical cannabinoids are concentrated in a viscous resin produced in structures known as glandular trichomes. At least 113 different cannabinoids have been isolated from the Cannabis plant. To the right, the main classes of cannabinoids from Cannabis are shown.

All classes derive from cannabigerol-type (CBG) compounds and differ mainly in the way this precursor is cyclized. The classical cannabinoids are derived from their respective 2-carboxylic acids (2-COOH) by decarboxylation (catalyzed by heat, light, or alkaline conditions).

Well known cannabinoids 
The best studied cannabinoids include tetrahydrocannabinol (THC), cannabidiol (CBD) and cannabinol (CBN).

Tetrahydrocannabinol 

Tetrahydrocannabinol (THC) is the primary psychoactive component of the Cannabis plant. Delta-9-tetrahydrocannabinol (Δ9-THC, THC) and delta-8-tetrahydrocannabinol (Δ8-THC), through intracellular CB1 activation, induce anandamide and 2-arachidonoylglycerol synthesis produced naturally in the body and brain. These cannabinoids produce the effects associated with cannabis by binding to the CB1 cannabinoid receptors in the brain.

Cannabidiol 

Cannabidiol (CBD) is mildly psychotropic. Evidence shows that the compound counteracts cognitive impairment associated with the use of cannabis. Cannabidiol has little affinity for CB1 and CB2 receptors but acts as an indirect antagonist of cannabinoid agonists. It was found to be an antagonist at the putative new cannabinoid receptor, GPR55, a GPCR expressed in the caudate nucleus and putamen. Cannabidiol has also been shown to act as a 5-HT1A receptor agonist. CBD can interfere with the uptake of adenosine, which plays an important role in biochemical processes, such as energy transfer. It may play a role in promoting sleep and suppressing arousal.

CBD shares a precursor with THC and is the main cannabinoid in CBD-dominant Cannabis strains. CBD has been shown to play a role in preventing the short-term memory loss associated with THC.

There is tentative evidence that CBD has an anti-psychotic effect, but research in this area is limited.

Cannabinol 

Cannabinol (CBN) is a mildly psychoactive cannabinoid that acts as a low affinity partial agonist at both CB1 and CB2 receptors. Through its mechanism of partial agonism at the CB1R, CBN is thought to interact with other kinds of neurotransmission (e.g., dopaminergic, serotonergic, cholinergic, and noradrenergic).

CBN was the first cannabis compound to be isolated from cannabis extract in the late 1800s. Its structure and chemical synthesis were achieved by 1940, followed by some of the first pre-clinical research studies to determine the effects of individual cannabis-derived compounds in vivo. Although CBN shares the same mechanism of action as other more well-known phytocannabinoids (e.g., delta-9 tetrahydrocannabinol or D9THC), it has a lower affinity for CB1 receptors, meaning that much higher doses of CBN are required in order to experience physiologic effects (e.g., mild sedation) associated with CB1R agonism. Although scientific reports are conflicting, the majority of findings suggest that CBN has a slightly higher affinity for CB2 as compared to CB1. Although CBN has been marketed as a sleep aid in recent years, there is a lack of scientific evidence to support these claims, warranting skepticism on the part of consumers.

Biosynthesis 
Cannabinoid production starts when an enzyme causes geranyl pyrophosphate and olivetolic acid to combine and form CBGA. Next, CBGA is independently converted to either CBG, THCA, CBDA or CBCA by four separate synthase, FAD-dependent dehydrogenase enzymes. There is no evidence for enzymatic conversion of CBDA or CBD to THCA or THC. For the propyl homologues (THCVA, CBDVA and CBCVA), there is an analogous pathway that is based on CBGVA from divarinolic acid instead of olivetolic acid.

Double bond position 
In addition, each of the compounds above may be in different forms depending on the position of the double bond in the alicyclic carbon ring. There is potential for confusion because there are different numbering systems used to describe the position of this double bond. Under the dibenzopyran numbering system widely used today, the major form of THC is called Δ9-THC, while the minor form is called Δ8-THC. Under the alternate terpene numbering system, these same compounds are called Δ1-THC and Δ6-THC, respectively.

Length 
Most classical cannabinoids are 21-carbon compounds. However, some do not follow this rule, primarily because of variation in the length of the side-chain attached to the aromatic ring. In THC, CBD, and CBN, this side-chain is a pentyl (5-carbon) chain. In the most common homologue, the pentyl chain is replaced with a propyl (3-carbon) chain. Cannabinoids with the propyl side chain are named using the suffix varin and are designated THCV, CBDV, or CBNV, while those with the heptyl side chain are named using the suffix phorol and are designated THCP and CBDP.

Cannabinoids in other plants 

Phytocannabinoids are known to occur in several plant species besides cannabis. These include Echinacea purpurea, Echinacea angustifolia, Acmella oleracea, Helichrysum umbraculigerum, and Radula marginata. The best-known cannabinoids that are not derived from Cannabis are the lipophilic alkamides (alkylamides) from Echinacea species, most notably the cis/trans isomers dodeca-2E,4E,8Z,10E/Z-tetraenoic-acid-isobutylamide. At least 25 different alkylamides have been identified, and some of them have shown affinities to the CB2-receptor.  In some Echinacea species, cannabinoids are found throughout the plant structure, but are most concentrated in the roots and flowers. Yangonin found in the Kava plant has significant affinity to the CB1 receptor. Tea (Camellia sinensis) catechins have an affinity for human cannabinoid receptors. A widespread dietary terpene, beta-caryophyllene, a component from the essential oil of cannabis and other medicinal plants, has also been identified as a selective agonist of peripheral CB2-receptors, in vivo. Black truffles contain anandamide. Perrottetinene, a moderately psychoactive cannabinoid, has been isolated from different Radula varieties.

Most of the phytocannabinoids are nearly insoluble in water but are soluble in lipids, alcohols, and other non-polar organic solvents.

Cannabis plant profile 
Cannabis plants can exhibit wide variation in the quantity and type of cannabinoids they produce. The mixture of cannabinoids produced by a plant is known as the plant's cannabinoid profile. Selective breeding has been used to control the genetics of plants and modify the cannabinoid profile. For example, strains that are used as fiber (commonly called hemp) are bred such that they are low in psychoactive chemicals like THC. Strains used in medicine are often bred for high CBD content, and strains used for recreational purposes are usually bred for high THC content or for a specific chemical balance.

Quantitative analysis of a plant's cannabinoid profile is often determined by gas chromatography (GC), or more reliably by gas chromatography combined with mass spectrometry (GC/MS). Liquid chromatography (LC) techniques are also possible and, unlike GC methods, can differentiate between the acid and neutral forms of the cannabinoids. There have been systematic attempts to monitor the cannabinoid profile of cannabis over time, but their accuracy is impeded by the illegal status of the plant in many countries.

Pharmacology 
Cannabinoids can be administered by smoking, vaporizing, oral ingestion, transdermal patch, intravenous injection, sublingual absorption, or rectal suppository. Once in the body, most cannabinoids are metabolized in the liver, especially by cytochrome P450 mixed-function oxidases, mainly CYP 2C9. Thus supplementing with CYP 2C9 inhibitors leads to extended intoxication.

Some is also stored in fat in addition to being metabolized in the liver. Δ9-THC is metabolized to 11-hydroxy-Δ9-THC, which is then metabolized to 9-carboxy-THC. Some cannabis metabolites can be detected in the body several weeks after administration. These metabolites are the chemicals recognized by common antibody-based "drug tests"; in the case of THC or others, these loads do not represent intoxication (compare to ethanol breath tests that measure instantaneous blood alcohol levels), but an integration of past consumption over an approximately month-long window. This is because they are fat-soluble, lipophilic molecules that accumulate in fatty tissues.

Research shows the effect of cannabinoids might be modulated by aromatic compounds produced by the cannabis plant, called terpenes. This interaction would lead to the entourage effect.

Modulation of mitochondrial activity 
Recent evidence has shown that cannabinoids play a role in the modulation of various mitochondrial processes, including intracellular calcium regulation, activation of apoptosis, impairment of electron transport chain activity, disruption of mitochondrial respiration and ATP production, and regulation of mitochondrial dynamics. These processes contribute to various aspects of cellular biology and can be modified in response to external stimuli. The interaction between cannabinoids and mitochondria is complex, and various molecular mechanisms have been proposed, including direct effects on mitochondrial membranes and receptor-mediated effects. However, an integrated hypothesis of cannabinoids' actions on these processes has yet to be formulated due to conflicting data and the complexity of the pathways involved.

Cannabinoid-based pharmaceuticals 
Nabiximols (brand name Sativex) is an aerosolized mist for oral administration containing a near 1:1 ratio of CBD and THC. Also included are minor cannabinoids and terpenoids, ethanol and propylene glycol excipients, and peppermint flavoring. The drug, made by GW Pharmaceuticals, was first approved by Canadian authorities in 2005 to alleviate pain associated with multiple sclerosis, making it the first cannabis-based medicine. It is marketed by Bayer in Canada. Sativex has been approved in 25 countries; clinical trials are underway in the United States to gain FDA approval. In 2007, it was approved for treatment of cancer pain. In Phase III trials, the most common adverse effects were dizziness, drowsiness and disorientation; 12% of subjects stopped taking the drug because of the side effects.

Dronabinol (brand name Marinol) is a THC drug used to treat poor appetite, nausea, and sleep apnea. It is approved by the FDA for treating HIV/AIDS induced anorexia and chemotherapy induced nausea and vomiting.

The CBD drug Epidiolex has been approved by the Food and Drug Administration for treatment of two rare and severe forms of epilepsy, Dravet and Lennox-Gastaut syndromes.

Separation 
Cannabinoids can be separated from the plant by extraction with organic solvents. Hydrocarbons and alcohols are often used as solvents. However, these solvents are flammable and many are toxic. Butane may be used, which evaporates extremely quickly. Supercritical solvent extraction with carbon dioxide is an alternative technique. Once extracted, isolated components can be separated using wiped film vacuum distillation or other distillation techniques. Also, techniques such as SPE or SPME are found useful in the extraction of these compounds.

History 
The first discovery of an individual cannabinoid was made, when British chemist Robert S. Cahn reported the partial structure of Cannabinol (CBN), which he later identified as fully formed in 1940.

Two years later, in 1942, American chemist, Roger Adams, made history when he discovered Cannabidiol (CBD). Progressing from Adams research, in 1963 Israeli professor Raphael Mechoulam later identified the stereochemistry of CBD. The following year, in 1964, Mechoulam and his team identified the stereochemistry of Tetrahydrocannabinol (THC).

Due to molecular similarity and ease of synthetic conversion, CBD was originally believed to be a natural precursor to THC. However, it is now known that CBD and THC are produced independently in the Cannabis plant from the precursor CBG.

  Endocannabinoids 
Endocannabinoids are substances produced from within the body that activate cannabinoid receptors. After the discovery of the first cannabinoid receptor in 1988, scientists began searching for endogenous ligand for the receptors.

Types of endocannabinoid ligands

Arachidonoylethanolamine (Anandamide or AEA) 

Anandamide was the first such compound identified as arachidonoyl ethanolamine. The name is derived from the Sanskrit word for bliss and -amide.  It has a pharmacology similar to THC, although its structure is quite different. Anandamide binds to the central (CB1) and, to a lesser extent, peripheral (CB2) cannabinoid receptors, where it acts as a partial agonist. Anandamide is about as potent as THC at the CB1 receptor. Anandamide is found in nearly all tissues in a wide range of animals. Anandamide has also been found in plants, including small amounts in chocolate.

Two analogs of anandamide, 7,10,13,16-docosatetraenoylethanolamide and homo-γ-linolenoylethanolamine, have similar pharmacology. All of these compounds are members of a family of signalling lipids called N-acylethanolamines, which also includes the noncannabimimetic palmitoylethanolamide and oleoylethanolamide, which possess anti-inflammatory and anorexigenic effects, respectively. Many N-acylethanolamines have also been identified in plant seeds and in molluscs.

2-Arachidonoylglycerol (2-AG) 

Another endocannabinoid, 2-arachidonoylglycerol, binds to both the CB1 and CB2 receptors with similar affinity, acting as a full agonist at both. 2-AG is present at significantly higher concentrations in the brain than anandamide, and there is some controversy over whether 2-AG rather than anandamide is chiefly responsible for endocannabinoid signalling in vivo. In particular, one in vitro study suggests that 2-AG is capable of stimulating higher G-protein activation than anandamide, although the physiological implications of this finding are not yet known.

2-Arachidonyl glyceryl ether (noladin ether) 

In 2001, a third, ether-type endocannabinoid, 2-arachidonyl glyceryl ether (noladin ether), was isolated from porcine brain. Prior to this discovery, it had been synthesized as a stable analog of 2-AG; indeed, some controversy remains over its classification as an endocannabinoid, as another group failed to detect the substance at "any appreciable amount" in the brains of several different mammalian species. It binds to the CB1 cannabinoid receptor (Ki = 21.2 nmol/L) and causes sedation, hypothermia, intestinal immobility, and mild antinociception in mice. It binds primarily to the CB1 receptor, and only weakly to the CB2 receptor.

N-Arachidonoyl dopamine (NADA) 

Discovered in 2000, NADA preferentially binds to the CB1 receptor. Like anandamide, NADA is also an agonist for the vanilloid receptor subtype 1 (TRPV1), a member of the vanilloid receptor family.

Virodhamine (OAE) 

A fifth endocannabinoid, virodhamine, or O-arachidonoyl-ethanolamine (OAE), was discovered in June 2002. Although it is a full agonist at CB2 and a partial agonist at CB1, it behaves as a CB1 antagonist in vivo. In rats, virodhamine was found to be present at comparable or slightly lower concentrations than anandamide in the brain, but 2- to 9-fold higher concentrations peripherally.

Lysophosphatidylinositol (LPI) 
Lysophosphatidylinositol is the endogenous ligand to novel endocannabinoid receptor GPR55, making it a strong contender as the sixth endocannabinoid.

Function 

Endocannabinoids serve as intercellular 'lipid messengers', signaling molecules that are released from one cell and activating the cannabinoid receptors present on other nearby cells. Although in this intercellular signaling role they are similar to the well-known monoamine neurotransmitters such as dopamine, endocannabinoids differ in numerous ways from them. For instance, they are used in retrograde signaling between neurons. Furthermore, endocannabinoids are lipophilic molecules that are not very soluble in water. They are not stored in vesicles and exist as integral constituents of the membrane bilayers that make up cells. They are believed to be synthesized 'on-demand' rather than made and stored for later use.

As hydrophobic molecules, endocannabinoids cannot travel unaided for long distances in the aqueous medium surrounding the cells from which they are released and therefore act locally on nearby target cells. Hence, although emanating diffusely from their source cells, they have much more restricted spheres of influence than do hormones, which can affect cells throughout the body.

The mechanisms and enzymes underlying the biosynthesis of endocannabinoids remain elusive and continue to be an area of active research.

The endocannabinoid 2-AG has been found in bovine and human maternal milk.

A review by Matties et al. (1994) summed up the phenomenon of gustatory enhancement by certain cannabinoids. The sweet receptor (Tlc1) is stimulated by indirectly increasing its expression and suppressing the activity of leptin, the Tlc1 antagonist. It is proposed that the competition of leptin and cannabinoids for Tlc1 is implicated in energy homeostasis.

Retrograde signal 
Conventional neurotransmitters are released from a ‘presynaptic’ cell and activate appropriate receptors on a ‘postsynaptic’ cell, where presynaptic and postsynaptic designate the sending and receiving sides of a synapse, respectively. Endocannabinoids, on the other hand, are described as retrograde transmitters because they most commonly travel ‘backward’ against the usual synaptic transmitter flow. They are, in effect, released from the postsynaptic cell and act on the presynaptic cell, where the target receptors are densely concentrated on axonal terminals in the zones from which conventional neurotransmitters are released. Activation of cannabinoid receptors temporarily reduces the amount of conventional neurotransmitter released. This endocannabinoid-mediated system permits the postsynaptic cell to control its own incoming synaptic traffic. The ultimate effect on the endocannabinoid-releasing cell depends on the nature of the conventional transmitter being controlled. For instance, when the release of the inhibitory transmitter GABA is reduced, the net effect is an increase in the excitability of the endocannabinoid-releasing cell. On the converse, when release of the excitatory neurotransmitter glutamate is reduced, the net effect is a decrease in the excitability of the endocannabinoid-releasing cell.

"Runner's high" 
The runner's high, the feeling of euphoria that sometimes accompanies aerobic exercise, has often been attributed to the release of endorphins, but newer research suggests that it might be due to endocannabinoids instead.

Synthetic cannabinoids 

Historically, laboratory synthesis of cannabinoids was often based on the structure of herbal cannabinoids, and a large number of analogs have been produced and tested, especially in a group led by Roger Adams as early as 1941 and later in a group led by Raphael Mechoulam. Newer compounds are no longer related to natural cannabinoids or are based on the structure of the endogenous cannabinoids.

Synthetic cannabinoids are particularly useful in experiments to determine the relationship between the structure and activity of cannabinoid compounds, by making systematic, incremental modifications of cannabinoid molecules.

When synthetic cannabinoids are used recreationally, they present significant health dangers to users.  In the period of 2012 through 2014, over 10,000 contacts to poison control centers in the United States were related to use of synthetic cannabinoids.

Medications containing natural or synthetic cannabinoids or cannabinoid analogs:
 Dronabinol (Marinol), is Δ9-tetrahydrocannabinol (THC), used as an appetite stimulant, anti-emetic, and analgesic
 Nabilone (Cesamet, Canemes), a synthetic cannabinoid and an analog of Marinol. It is Schedule II unlike Marinol, which is Schedule III
 Rimonabant (SR141716), a selective cannabinoid (CB1) receptor inverse agonist once used as an anti-obesity drug under the proprietary name Acomplia. It was also used for smoking cessation

Other notable synthetic cannabinoids include:
 JWH-018, a potent synthetic cannabinoid agonist discovered by John W. Huffman at Clemson University. It was often sold in legal smoke blends collectively known as "spice". Several countries and states have moved to ban it legally.
 JWH-073
 CP-55940, produced in 1974, this synthetic cannabinoid receptor agonist is many times more potent than THC.
 Dimethylheptylpyran
 HU-210, about 100 times as potent as THC
 HU-211, a synthetic cannabinoid derived drug that acts on NMDA instead of endocannabinoid system
 HU-331 a potential anti-cancer drug derived from cannabidiol that specifically inhibits topoisomerase II.
 SR144528, a CB2 receptor antagonist/ inverse agonist
 WIN 55,212-2, a potent cannabinoid receptor agonist
 JWH-133, a potent selective CB2 receptor agonist
 Levonantradol (Nantrodolum), an anti-emetic and analgesic but not currently in use in medicine
 AM-2201, a potent cannabinoid receptor agonist
Recently, the term "neocannabinoid" has been introduced to distinguish these designer drugs from synthetic phytocannabinoids (THC or CBD obtained by chemical synthesis) or synthetic endocannabinoids.

See also 

 Cancer and nausea § Cannabinoid
 Cannabinoid receptor antagonist
 Endocannabinoid enhancer
 Endocannabinoid reuptake inhibitor

References

External links